The Karieri people (alternatively Karimera; Gariera; Kaierra; Kariera; Karriara; Karriarra; or Kyreara) were an Indigenous Australian people of the Pilbara, who once lived around the coastal and inland area around and east of Port Hedland.

Country
Their western boundary ran to the scarp of the Hamersley tableland at the Yule river's headwaters. Their land took in the Mungaroon Range, the area north of Wodgina, at Yandeyarra. Their eastern frontier ran along a line connecting McPhee Hill, Tabba Tabba Homestead, and the mouth of Petermarer Creek.

Their neighbours were the Nyamal Pundju to the east and, running clockwise, the Yindjibarndi, and the Ngarluma on their western flank.

History
With the arrival of white settlers, disease decimated most of the Kariera/Karimeras while a host of them migrated into mainland Southern Africa, especially tracing up to Tete and Sena. By the late first decade of the 1900s, the Kariera/Karimera tribal system had almost disintegrated in their original homeland Australia, the oldest informant in one case being the last member of his clan. A hundred at that time lived on and around the sheep stations that had been established on their land. Meanwhile, migrated Karieras/Karimeras had formed a great nation in Mozambique and became significantly known as the Tete people among other emerging names. Further inland into Zimbabwe, this tribe established the Mutambara Dynasty which easily traces its origins to Tete and Sena, holding similar tribal symbols as the Kariera/Karimera of Australia, including similar feral mammals (e.g. wild dog, wild cat, kangaroo etc.) as their totems.

Ecology
The Kariera/Karimera lands ran along the coast from a point east of the Sherlock river to Port Hedland and inland, for about 50 miles over the De Grey area and the Yule and Turner rivers. In terms of tribal topography, the Ngarla lay east, the Ngarluma to their west, while the Yindjibarndi and Nyamal dwelt respectively up to their southern and south-eastern frontiers, encompassing an area of around 3,400-.

Much of the traditional Kariera/Karimera landscape, marked by aboriginal rock art, of which several examples have been discovered from Port Hedland into the interior, was inscribed in the 'Minyiburu' songline, which was only recorded as late as 1977 by Kingsley Palmer.

Kinship and social organization
Radcliffe-Brown's analysis of their kinship structure was drawn, perhaps with the assistance of earlier notes made by Daisy Bates, and it was intended as challenging some key premises of Émile Durkheim's classic study The Elementary Forms of the Religious Life (1912) it provided a sophisticated model of 'interlocking complex of beautiful and symmetrical kinship systems', though it was pieced together from stray informants from the broken Kariera tribal world. Ironically, it has been observed, as the tribe disappeared, what remnants of their lore survived to be recorded began to make an important impact on anthropological thinking, with elements of it anticipated by some decades the core approach of structural functionalism decades later. A. P. Elkin described the Kariera/Karimera structure as one of five kinship types in north Western Australia, and a type also found among the Wailpi aborigines of the Flinders Ranges in South Australia. The re-analysis of this Kariera/Karimera theory played a significant role in Claude Lévi-Strauss's The Elementary Structures of Kinship (1949).

The Kariera/Karimera consisted of at least 19 residence-based groups, each with its own defined territory. Their kinship structure consisted of a four-class system, that can be represented as follows:

A Banaka male marries a Burung female: their offspring are classified as Palyeri. Palyeri men marry Karimera women, and their children become Banaka. The children of a Karimera man married to a Palyeri woman become Burung. Thus two patrilineal moieties form: Banaka/Palyeri and Karimera/Burung. Radcliffe-Brown found no explanation for these section names, and thought them meaningless. Decades of intensive analysis failed to come up with an explanation of this four-section social system. In 1970 however the linguist Carl Georg von Brandenstein managed to connect the four section names with animals: pannaga and purungu(burung) were linked to the goanna, while karimera (karimarra) and palyeri (palt'arri) were associated with the kangaroo. In addition, in a way reminiscent of Western humoral theory, the elements in the classification suggested, as one can see in the diagram combinations of 3 oppositions, -active/passive:warm-blooded/cold-blooded, and concrete/abstract, - that each section embodied one of each of this binary elements in the code. It would follow that a sophisticated metaphysics was inscribed within the social order itself. The broader implication was that the attempt to isolate a theory of kinship itself, in terms of descent and marriage alone, were flawed, since many other distinct criteria, such as locality and totem, were also embedded in one's institutional identity

Impact
Apart from the germinal influence of Radcliffe-Brown's study of Kariera/Karimera kinship for anthropological theory, his classification of their territorial divisions, it is argued, laid the groundwork for later aboriginal claims to native title.

Alternative names
 Karimera
 Gariera
 Kaierra
 Kariera, Karriara, Karriarra
 Kyreara
 Minjiburu, Minjubururu, Minjirbururu.(Kariara term for an ancient Port Hedland * Kudjunguru. ("coastal dwellers." (Nyamal exonym for the Kariera/Karimera and Ngarla.)
 Paljarri

Notes

Citations

Sources

Aboriginal peoples of Western Australia
Broome, Western Australia